Koigi may refer to different places in Estonia:
Koigi, Järva County, village in Järva Parish, Järva County
Koigi Parish, former municipality in Järva County
Koigi (air base) (also Nurmsi Airfield), former soviet air base in Estonia
Koigi, Rapla County, village in Rapla Parish, Rapla County
Koigi, Saare County, village in Saaremaa Parish, Saare County